Uygar Mert Zeybek (born 4 June 1995) is a Turkish footballer who plays as a midfielder for Afjet Afyonspor on loan from Pendikspor.

Club career 

Zeybek is a youth exponent from Fenerbahçe. He made his Süper Lig debut at 31 May 2015 against Kasımpaşa. He replaced Emre Belözoğlu in extra time in a 2-0 home win.

External links
TFF.org Profile

References

1995 births
People from Bursa
Living people
Turkish footballers
Turkey youth international footballers
Turkey under-21 international footballers
Association football midfielders
Fenerbahçe S.K. footballers
İstanbulspor footballers
Pendikspor footballers
Tarsus Idman Yurdu footballers
Süper Lig players
TFF First League players
TFF Second League players